Georgios Kalogiannidis (born 21 November 1982) is an archer from Greece. He competed at the 2004 Summer Olympics.

He was defeated in the first round of elimination, placing 54th overall.

Kalogiannidis was also a member of the 13th-place Greek men's archery team at the 2004 Summer Olympics.

References

1982 births
Living people
Greek male archers
Archers at the 2004 Summer Olympics
Olympic archers of Greece
21st-century Greek people